The Tranvía de Sóller is a Spanish heritage tramway serving the town of Sóller and the coastal village of Port de Sóller, in the island of Majorca. It is owned by Ferrocarril de Sóller S.A. (FS), the same company operating the heritage rail line linking the town to the city of Palma.

The Tranvía de Sóller is one of only two first generation tramways to survive in Spain, along with the Tramvia Blau in the city of Barcelona.

Overview
The Soller tramway line, which was designed and constructed by the engineer Pedro Garau, opened on 4 October 1913 shortly after the inauguration of Palma-Sóller rail line, and started regular service on 13 October of that year. Electrified from the start of operation, the line is 4.868 km long, has a single track with passing loops and runs on  narrow gauge tracks. It is a popular tourist attraction, especially since the early 2000s, as it uses attractive heritage rolling stock. In 2010 it carried approximately 900,000 passengers.

Along with other small towns such as Gmunden (Austria: Gmunden Tramway) or Volchansk (Russia: Volchansk tram system), Sóller is one of the smallest European towns with an urban tramway system.

Route
The line has 17 stations, most of them simple stops consisting of a concrete platform, with no buildings. Trams run at approximately 30 minute intervals from 07:00 to midnight, reduced to one trip per hour from 20:00.

The route starts at Sóller railway station, and the southern passenger terminus is just outside the entrance to that station. Trams start inside the railway yard at the tram depot, which is linked to the main railway. On arrival from Port de Soller, trams enter the yard to shunt locomotives for the return trip, but passengers are not allowed into the depot.

The track passes through the town's centre, close to the church of San Bartolomé and goes through the main square, sharing the public road with motor vehicles. The line then follows its own route, through the northern suburb of Sóller and the village of Horta, crosses the MA-11 road, and then runs parallel to that road. Finally, it enters the town of Port de Sóller at the "Sa Torre" stop, and travels along the pedestrianised seafront to the marina at the north end.

The provision of passing loops enables several vehicles to be in transit between the termini, and in high season relief trams run closely behind the scheduled trams, and both tram sets can be accommodated in a loop.

Rolling stock
The rolling stock of the Tranvía comprises:

Gallery

See also 
 List of town tramway systems in Spain
 Majorca rail network (scheme map)
 Palma Metro
 Serveis Ferroviaris de Mallorca

Notes

References

External links 

  (English home)
El Tren De Soller: Mallorca's Vintage Electric Railway on 'Tim Traveller' (YouTube)
Sóller Tramway at urbanrail.net: map, infos, pictures
 Tourist office of Sóller

Soller
Sóller
3 ft gauge railways in Spain
Rail transport in the Balearic Islands
Railway lines opened in 1913
1913 establishments in Spain
Sóller

de:Ferrocarril de Sóller#Tramvia de Sóller